Brian Abrahams (born 26 June 1947 in Cape Town, South Africa) is a South African jazz drummer and vocalist.

Early life 
Abrahams started working as a singer with local bands in South Africa in the 1970s. Abrahams participated in a gig in Swaziland as drummer for Sarah Vaughan and Nancy Wilson. In 1975 he moved to the United Kingdom, where he gained his recognition.

Musical career 
Abrahams has worked with groups and artists such as Abdullah Ibrahim, Dudu Pukwana, Ronnie Scott, John Taylor, Johnny Dyani, Brotherhood of Breath, Jim Pepper, Dewey Redman, Mal Waldron, Archie Shepp, and Courtney Pine.

During the 1980s Abrahams founded his own group, District Six. In 1988 he joined the band Ekaya, which was founded by Abdullah Ibrahim. He joined Grand Union Orchestra in 1992 and has been working on projects led by Tony Haynes.

Abrahams re-formed District Six in Melbourne, Australia in 2009 for a performance at Dizzy's Jazz Club featuring Tony Hicks (tenor saxophone), John McAll (piano), Zvi Belling (bass), Cameron McAlister (trumpet) and Brian Abrahams (drums). District Six performed at the Wangaratta Jazz Festival in November 2009.

Abrahams currently lives and works in Melbourne and is a tutor for aspiring jazz students at the Australian Jazz Museum.

Discography
Imgoma Yabantwana (D6 Records)
To Be Free (EG Editions Jazz)
Force of Nature (Reel Recordings) w/ Mike Osborne
The Rhythm Of Tides (RedGold Records, 1997) w/ Grand Union Orchestra
Now Comes The Dragon's Hour (RedGold Records, 2002) w/ Grand Union Orchestra
12 For 12 (RedGold Records, 2011) w/ Grand Union Orchestra
If Paradise (RedGold Records, 2011) w/ Grand Union Orchestra

Notes

References

1947 births
Living people
South African jazz drummers
Avant-garde jazz drummers
20th-century South African musicians
21st-century South African musicians